Brushford may refer to:

Brushford, Devon
Brushford, Somerset